Pontaumur is a village and commune located 41 kilometres west from Clermont-Ferrand in the Puy-de-Dôme department in Auvergne in central France.

Since 2004, its church has been home to a replica of the organ at Arnstadt, on which Johann Sebastian Bach played. Initially launched to raise funds for the organ, the Festival Bach en Combrailles takes place every summer in Pontaumur and neighbouring villages, celebrating Bach's music.

See also
Communes of the Puy-de-Dôme department

References

Communes of Puy-de-Dôme
Auvergne